The Myanmar men's national volleyball team is the volleyball national team of Myanmar, represents Myanmar in international volleyball competitions and friendly matches. Men team grabbed gold in 1961 ,1965 ,1969 ,1975 ,1977 ,1979 and 1983 SEA Games.The highest achievement at asian games is 4th place at 1978 asian games. Myanmar youth men team captured southeast asian junior men volleyball championship with a record of 9 times.

Current squad
Squad at the 2013 Southeast Asian Games
 Coach: Augusto J.S.

Competition history

Asian Championship
 Champions   Runners up   Third place   Fourth place

Asian Games
 Champions   Runners up   Third place   Fourth place

Asian Cup
 Champions   Runners up   Third place   Fourth place

Southeast Asian Games
 Champions   Runners up   Third place   Fourth place

References

National men's volleyball teams
Volleyball in Myanmar
Volleyball
Men's sport in Myanmar